Debatosh Guha (Bengali:দেবতোষ গুহ ) is an Indian microwave and antenna researcher and a Professor at the Institute of Radio Physics and Electronics at the Rajabazar Science College, University of Calcutta. He is an Adjunct faculty at the Malaviya National Institute of Technology Jaipur and had also served Indian Institute of Technology Kharagpur (IIT Khargapur) as a HAL Chair Professor for a period during 2015-2016.

Education and career

He received the B. Tech. and M. Tech. degrees in Radio Physics and Electronics from the Rajabazar Science College campus of University of Calcutta in 1987 and 1989, respectively. He spent about 8 months at a wireless industry of Webel-Philips in Kolkata before receiving a senior research fellowship from the CSIR, Government of India, and obtained his Ph. D. degree in microwave engineering in 1994. In the same year, Guha was appointed as an assistant professor in Radio Physics and Electronics at the University of Calcutta. He had undertaken his post-doctoral research at the Royal Military College of Canada, the Canadian Defense University at Kingston, Ontario

At the University of Calcutta, he has been a department head (2016–2018) and Director of the Centre for Research in Nanoscience and Nanotechnology (2017- 2019).

Guha has been selected for Abdul Kalam Technology Innovation National Fellowship (2020) and was elected a fellow of IEEE, Indian National Science Academy, the Indian Academy of Sciences, the National Academy of Sciences, India, and the Indian National Academy of Engineering.
He has been a visiting professor at the Royal Military College of Canada (2007, 2008, 2010, 2012, 2013, 2017, 2018) and visiting scientists/invited speaker to several foreign universities viz. the University of Houston (2002), Queen Mary University of London (2006), University of Bath (2006), Communication Research Centre, Ottawa (2006), University of Alberta (2012), San Diego State University (2014), Karlsruhe Institute of Technology (2014), Chuo University Tokyo (2014), City University of Hong Kong (2016), University of Waterloo (2017)

A recipient of the Jawaharlal Nehru Memorial Fund Prize, he was awarded the 1996 URSI Young Scientist Award at Lille, France; 2012 Raj Mitra Travel Grant Award of IEEE AP Society at Chicago; 2016 IETE Ram Lal Wadhwa Award at New Delhi; and 2020 IPCR’s Acharya P C Ray Memorial Award for Distinguished Achievements in Innovations in Science and Technology at Kolkata.
He has served the IEEE Fields Award Committee of IEEE AP-Society as a member (2018-2019) and the Indian Joint National Committee as URSI Commission-B Lead for 2015-2020. He has served both IEEE Transactions on Antennas and Propagation and IEEE Antennas and Wireless Propagation Letters as an associate editor.

He has been closely involved with IEEE and URSI activities. He served IEEE Kolkata Section as the chair (2013-2014) and IEEE AP/MTT Kolkata Chapter as the founding Chair. In 2007, he introduced IEEE Applied Electromagnetics Conference (AEMC) as a major biennial International meeting in India and co-chaired its first three sessions in 2007, 2009, and 2011. In 2010, he established IEEE Indian Antenna Week (IAW) as an annual International Antenna Workshop with fabulous support from the IEEE AP-Society and chaired the first two editions in Mayfair Puri (2010) and Hyatt Regency Kolkata (2011). He has also been associated with the organisations of several international events including APCAP, EMTS, EUCAP, URSI-GASS, URSI AP-RASC.

Awards and honours

Acharyya Prafulla Chandra Ray Memorial Award for Distinguished Achievements in Innovations in Science and Technology (IPCR, Kolkata) 2020

Abdul Kalam Technology Innovation National Fellow (2020)

Fellow, IEEE ♦ 
Fellow, Indian National Science Academy ♦ Fellow, Indian Academy of Sciences ♦
Fellow, The National Academy of Sciences, India ♦
Fellow, Indian National Academy of Engineering ♦ Fellow, West Bengal Academy of Science and Technology  ♦ Fellow, Institution of Electronics and Telecommunication Engineers

IETE Ram Lal Wadhwa Award (New Delhi, 2016) ♦ IEEE AP-S Raj Mittra Travel Grant Award (Chicago 2012)

URSI Young Scientist Award (Lille, France 1996) ♦ Jawaharlal Nehru Memorial Fund Prize (New Delhi, 1984)

Research and published works

Guha and his research group have contributed towards the development of science and engineering for both microstrip antenna and Dielectric Resonator Antenna (DRA).
Guha introduced the concept of Defected Ground Structure (DGS) integration technique to microstrip antenna and developed the theoretical understanding followed by experiments. His group explained the mechanism of weakening the cross-pol generating modes and mitigating two major issues in microstrip elements and arrays: (i) high cross-polarized radiations and (ii) mutual coupling among array elements causing scan-blindness in the radiation patterns.

A long challenging issue of high cross-polarized radiations occurring across the diagonal planes of a microstrip patch has been resolved by his group in 2020. The source of the problem has been theoretically identified along with some representative solutions in two different ground current conditions.

His original contributions to Dielectric Resonator Antennas (DRAs) encompass (i) introduction of a new and a truly useful radiating mode in cylindrical DRAs and (ii)  concept of multi-mode engineering - a more theory-based methodology using composite and hybrid structures, which changed the traditional concept of wideband or ultra-wideband DRA designs. To establish the viability of the new mode, he has developed new feeding techniques which should ideally satisfy the requirement of integratable feed for mm-wave tiny antennas.

Book
Microstrip and Printed Antennas: New Trends, Techniques, and Applications, Wiley UK, 2011

References

External links
  Profile 
  Publication & Citation 

Indian electrical engineers
Academic staff of the University of Calcutta
Engineers from West Bengal
Scientists from Kolkata
Living people
Year of birth missing (living people)